KAZM (780 AM) is a radio station broadcasting a mixed format consisting of news, sports, variety talk, classic rock and oldies music, the Wolfman Jack show, and Coast to Coast AM at night.  Licensed to Sedona, Arizona, United States. The station is currently owned by Tabback Broadcasting Co. and features programming from Fox News Radio, ESPN Radio, and CBS Radio.  In 2013, KAZM will add NBC Sports Radio to its list of affiliations, and carry the Erik Kuselias show on weekday evenings.

KAZM's skywave signal has been received in Green River, Wyoming, and Salt Lake City, Utah. KAZM can be received across most of northern Arizona during the day, and can be heard in Phoenix under the right conditions.

KAZM is a Class D station broadcasting on the clear-channel frequency of 780 kHz.  WBBM in Chicago, Illinois is the dominant Class A station on this frequency within the lower 48 states.  KNOM in Nome, Alaska is also a Class A station.

History
KAZM first signed on the air on November 1, 1974. The station throughout the years ran a couple of formats. First as MOR and then later adult contemporary from 1984 until the 1990s. It would then become its current "brokered" News/Talk/Sports/Classic Rock/Oldies station.

References

External links
 FCC History Cards for KAZM
 

AZM
Radio stations established in 1974
News and talk radio stations in the United States
Sports radio stations in the United States
1974 establishments in Arizona